JSC may refer to:

 Jane Street Capital, a global proprietary trading firm
 Johnson State College, one of the Vermont State Colleges, and located at Johnson, Vermont, United States
 Joint Staff College
 Jeffree Star Cosmetics, an American cosmetics franchise 
 Joint-stock company
 Judicial Service Commission (disambiguation), the body tasked with appointing judges in several Commonwealth countries
 Julio Sánchez Cristo, a Latin American radio personality
 Jubilee Sports Centre, the former name of the Hong Kong Sports Institute
 Junior School Certificate, a public examination in Bangladesh
 Johnson Space Center, the National Air and Space Administration's mission flight control and astronaut training facility at Houston, Texas, United States
 Vostok Aviation Company, an airline headquartered in Khabarovsk, Russia and subsidiary of UTair Group
 Postnomial letters for a Judge of the New Jersey Superior Court
 Al Jazeera Satellite Channel, a state-funded broadcaster in Doha, Qatar, owned by the Al Jazeera Media Network